Laar may refer to:

Places
 Laar, Germany
 Laar, Maasbree, Limburg, Netherlands
 Laar, Nuth, Limburg, Netherlands
 Laar, Weert, Limburg, Netherlands
 Laar, Cranendonck, North Brabant, Netherlands
 Laar, Nuenen, North Brabant, Netherlands
 Laar, Sint-Michielsgestel, North Brabant, Netherlands
 Laar, Vught, North Brabant, Netherlands
 Laar, Zemst-Laar, Flemish Brabant, Belgium

People
Laar (surname)

LAAR may refer to:
Technology
 Light Attack/Armed Reconnaissance, or LAAR, a United States Air Force procurement program
Medicine
 Ligue Algérienne Antirhumatismale (Algerian League Against Rheumatism), or LAAR, an Algerian association in the field of rheumatology

See also 
 Lahr